Subtext is any content of a creative work which is not announced explicitly (by  characters or author) but is implicit, or becomes something understood by the audience.  Subtext has been used historically to imply controversial subjects without drawing the attention (or wrath) of censors. This has been especially true in comedy; it is also common in science fiction, where it can be easier—and/or safer—to deliver a social critique if, e.g., set in a time other than the (author's) present.

Definitions

Subtext is content "sub" i.e. "under" (with the sense of "hidden beneath") the verbatim wording; readers or audience must "gather" subtext "reading between the lines" or inferring meaning, a process needed for a clear and complete understanding of the text.  A meaning stated explicitly is, by definition not subtext (for lack of hiding), and writers may be criticized for failure artfully to create and use subtext; such works may be faulted as too "on the nose", with the characters  meaning  what they literally have said, undermining dramatic tension, and leaving the work too prosaic.

Subtext also may be included in the action of narratives, with secondary themes expressed in order to appeal to a general audience; such approaches to sexual or otherwise more adult story-content, in works accessible to the young, often fails to "register" for the young reader, though adults will understand—perhaps even appreciating the mental stimulation offered them, in catching the child-invisible nuances.

Formats for creating subtext
Below are the main types of subtext that are used in film:
Have a character comment on an aspect of another person's relationship which is present in the relationship of the people in the current conversation. The series titled Mad Men regularly does this.
Body language communicates subtext. Body language is often used to convey whether a character is welcoming or threatening.
Implied accusations, often communicated through leading questions, are a form of subtext. For example, when a lawyer asks you "what were you doing on the night of the 23rd", that is an implied accusation.
Facial expressions and voice tone express many things including discontent and suspicion. For example, a quiet one-word answer to a question implies that the speaker is lying and that they don't want to say the true answer.
The subtext of how much people care for each other can be communicated by showing the amount of care, interest, and attentiveness people have for each other's opinions, desires, and character traits.
Linguistic implicature studies the kinds of subtext that are often used within language itself.

See also

References

Literary concepts
Fiction
Theme